Hoffman-Bowers-Josey-Riddick House is a historic home located at Scotland Neck, Halifax County, North Carolina. It was built in 1883, and is a -story, rectangular, frame dwelling with Stick Style / Eastlake movement design elements.  It has a complex polychromed, slate roof gable roof; three-story central tower with hexagonal roof; and one-story rear ell.  It features a front porch with sawn balustrade.

It was listed on the National Register of Historic Places in 1988. It is located in the Scotland Neck Historic District.

References

Houses on the National Register of Historic Places in North Carolina
Queen Anne architecture in North Carolina
Houses completed in 1883
Houses in Halifax County, North Carolina
National Register of Historic Places in Halifax County, North Carolina
Historic district contributing properties in North Carolina